Mandari may refer to:
Mandari people, ethnic group of South Sudan, one of the Nilotic peoples
Mandari dialect, dialect of the Mandari people
Malayalam word for the disease of the eriophyid coconut mite Eriophyes guerreronis